James Marsh (July 19, 1794July 3, 1842) was an American philosopher, Congregational clergyman and president of the University of Vermont from 1826 to 1833.

Biography
Marsh was born in Hartford, Vermont, and educated at Dartmouth College, graduating in 1817 from the college-in-exile in opposition to Dartmouth University, the state university that was set up in an attempt to destroy the Dartmouth College. He then graduated from Andover Theological Seminary in 1822, meanwhile serving as tutor at Dartmouth 1818–1820, and spending several months in study at Cambridge, Massachusetts. In October 1824, he was ordained as a Congregational clergyman at Hanover, New Hampshire; then was a professor of languages and biblical literature at Hampden–Sydney College (Virginia) until 1826.

He built a philosophy based on the works of Samuel Taylor Coleridge.  As president of the University of Vermont, Marsh instituted a program of a unified study where all seniors took a course in philosophy that sought to create a centralized model of knowledge. He introduced a less severe discipline among the students. He then resigned the presidency to become professor of moral and intellectual philosophy, where he served until his death. His philosophy would influence student William A. Wheeler, who in the future would become Vice President of the United States.

James Marsh died in Burlington, Vermont on July 3, 1842.

He was a nephew of Vermont lawyer Charles Marsh.

Writings
His literary work was quite large, and he was among the first to revive by his writings the scholastic dogma of "Crede ut intelligas," in opposition to that of "Intellige ut credas." In 1829 he contributed a series of papers on "Popular Education" to the Vermont Chronicle, under the pen name of "Philopolis", and he published a "Preliminary Essay" to Coleridge's Aids to Reflection (Burlington, 1829), and Selections from the Old English Writers on Practical Theology (1830). Besides these he issued several translations from the German, including Johann Gottfried Herder's Spirit of Hebrew Poetry (1833). His literary remains were collected and published, with a memoir of their author, by Joseph Torrey (1843).

Notes

Sources
 Louis Menand. The Metaphysical Club: A Story of Ideas in America. (New York: Farrar, Straus and Giroux, 2001) p. 238-250. 
 Article on Marsh and transcendentalism
 

1794 births
1842 deaths
Presidents of the University of Vermont
Dartmouth College alumni
Andover Theological Seminary alumni
University of Vermont faculty
Hampden–Sydney College faculty
19th-century American philosophers
People from Hartford, Vermont